Cecile Richards (born July 15, 1957)  is an American activist who served as the president of the Planned Parenthood Federation of America and president of the Planned Parenthood Action Fund from 2006 to 2018. In 2010, Richards was elected to the Ford Foundation board of trustees. In spring 2019, Richards co-founded Supermajority, a women's political action group.

Early life, education, and political activism
Richards was born in Waco, Texas, and is the daughter of former Texas Governor Ann Richards ( Willis), an American politician and activist. Her father, David Richards, practiced law and built a practice dealing with civil-rights plaintiffs, newspapers, and labor unions. He also won several landmark cases, including a voting-rights lawsuit that went to the Supreme Court. Cecile Richards initially went to public school, but, in ninth grade, she was disciplined for protesting the Vietnam War, after she wore a black armband. She then attended the progressive St. Stephen's Episcopal School for the remainder of high school.

Richards' parents were immersed in political activism from her early years on.  In January of 1971 at the age of 13 she was named an honorary page to the 62nd Texas State Legislator.  At the age of 16, she helped her mother campaign for Sarah Weddington, the attorney who won Roe v. Wade, in her bid for the Texas state legislature.

Richards graduated with a bachelor's degree in history from Brown University (1980). After graduation, she became a labor organizer for service workers across several states, running union campaigns for garment workers, nursing home workers, and janitors. When she was 30, she moved back to Texas to help with her mother, Ann Richards', campaign for governor. 
She is currently on the board of the Ford Foundation, a global private foundation with the mission of advancing human welfare. She was one of the founders of America Votes, a 501(c)4 organization that aims to co-ordinate and promote progressive issues, and is currently serving as president. Before that, she was deputy chief of staff to Nancy Pelosi, the Democratic leader in the U.S. House of Representatives. She has also worked at the Turner Foundation. In 1996, she founded the Texas Freedom Network, a Texas organization formed to counter the Christian right. She also serves on the board of advisors of Let America Vote, an organization founded by former Missouri Secretary of State Jason Kander that aims to end voter suppression.

Richards stepped down as president of Planned Parenthood in 2018 and was succeeded by Leana Wen. In April 2019, Richards co-founded a new political action group, Supermajority, to educate and train women to further women's political agenda for the 2020 elections.

Supermajority
In April 2019, Richards co-founded a new political action group, Supermajority, that "aims to train and mobilize 2 million women over the next year to become organizers, activists, and leaders ahead of the 2020 election" to create a "multiracial, intergenerational movement for women's equity." Founded with activists Alicia Garza and Ai-jen Poo, the group hopes to "push politicians to adopt an agenda akin to what Richards called 'a women's new deal'", with issues like "voting rights, gun control, paid family leave, equal pay, and others" viewed as "soft issues" being seen as "issues that impact everyone". Since women comprised the majority of the electorate in the 2018 midterm election, Supermajority hopes to further this trend, educating women on "basic organizing skills like voter registration" and building a larger platform for female candidates in the 2020 election. Richards says "[the group will be successful] if 54% of the voters in this country are women and if we are able to insert into this country the issues that women care about and elect a president who's committed to doing something about them."

Writing
She contributed the piece "Combating the Religious Right" to the 2003 anthology Sisterhood Is Forever: The Women's Anthology for a New Millennium, edited by Robin Morgan.

In 2018 Richards published her memoir Make Trouble: Standing Up, Speaking Out, and Finding the Courage to Lead. The memoir discusses her upbringing and career.

Personal life

Richards is married to Kirk Adams, a labor organizer with the Service Employees International Union, and has three children. Their eldest, Lily Adams, served as press secretary for Tim Kaine, later as an advisor of communications for Hillary Clinton's Democratic presidential campaign and communications director for Kamala Harris' presidential campaign. Richards and her husband live in New York City.

Awards and honors
 2010 Puffin/Nation Prize for Creative Citizenship
 2012 Time magazine's 100 Most Influential People in the World

References

External links
 Supermajority.com

 
 Coverage of Cecile Richards at The Texas Tribune

1957 births
Activists from New York City
Activists from Texas
American abortion-rights activists
American feminists
Brown University alumni
Living people
New York (state) Democrats
People from Austin, Texas
People from Waco, Texas
Presidents of Planned Parenthood
Texas Democrats